Šmits (feminine: Šmite and Šmita) is a Latvian masculine surname derived from the German occupational surname Schmidt, from the German language word schmied meaning "blacksmith" and/or "metalworker". 

People with the surname Šmits include:
 Anatolijs Šmits (1941–1998), Latvian chess master
 Jānis Šmits (also known as Yanis Smits; 1941–2020), Latvian theologian and Baptist pastor
 Jānis Šmits (born 1968), Latvian politician
 Rolands Šmits (born 1995), Latvian basketball player

References

Occupational surnames
Latvian-language masculine surnames